The 2018–19 ISU World Standings and Season's World Ranking are the World Standings and Season's World Ranking published by the International Skating Union (ISU) during the 2018–19 season.

The single & pair skating and ice dance rankings take into account results of the 2016–17, 2017–18 and 2018–19 seasons. 

The 2018–19 ISU season's world ranking is based on the results of the 2018–19 season only.

The 2018–19 ISU world standings for synchronized skating are based on the results of the 2016–17, 2017–18 and 2018–19 seasons.

World Standings for single & pair skating and ice dance

Season's End Standings

Men's singles 
.

Ladies' singles 
.

Pairs 
.

Ice dance 
.

World standings for synchronized skating

Season-end standings 
The remainder of this section is a complete list, by level, published by the ISU.

Senior Synchronized (54 teams)

Junior Synchronized (61 teams)

See also 
 ISU World Standings and Season's World Ranking
 List of highest ranked figure skaters by nation
 List of ISU World Standings and Season's World Ranking statistics
 2018–19 figure skating season

References

External links 
 International Skating Union
 ISU World standings for Single & Pair Skating and Ice Dance / ISU Season's World Ranking
 ISU World standings for Synchronized Skating

ISU World Standings and Season's World Ranking
Standings and Ranking
Standings and Ranking